The 1922 South American Championship Final was the final match to determine the winner of the 1922 South American Championship, the 6th. edition of this continental competition. It was held on October 22, 1922, in Estádio das Laranjeiras of Rio de Janeiro. At the end of the tournament, Brazil, Paraguay and Uruguay were tied on points, and playoff matches were planned for the three teams. 

Nevertheless, Uruguay withdrew after informing the organisers their players had to return home; some noted Uruguay were also dissatisfied with a suspicious performance of the Brazilian referee in their game against Paraguay, which they lost. As a result, only one playoff match was played between Brazil and Paraguay to determine the champion. Brazil won the match against Paraguay 3–0. With this victory, Brazil won its second continental title.

Qualified teams

Route to the final 

Notes
 Brazil, Paraguay and Uruguay finished tied on points so a final round should have been played to decide the champion. As Uruguay withdrew, Brazil and Paraguay played a final match.

Match details

Aftermath

References

1922 South American Championship
Brazil national football team matches
Paraguay national football team matches
Copa América finals
International sports competitions in Rio de Janeiro (city)
October 1922 sports events